Reality Rap is third studio album by Infamous Mobb. Production by includes Alchemist, Sid Roams, Erick Sermon, Havoc, and  Evidence.

Track listing

Samples
 Get it poppin' - Sample from "Total Eclipse of the Heart" by Bonnie Tyler

References 

2007 albums
Infamous Mobb albums
Albums produced by Erick Sermon
Albums produced by the Alchemist (musician)
Albums produced by Havoc (musician)
Albums produced by Evidence (musician)